Kyle Kaiser (born March 5, 1996) is an American racing driver from Santa Clara, California, and won the 2017 Indy Lights Championship with Juncos Racing. He is also currently enrolled in classes part-time at Santa Clara University in Santa Clara, California.

Racing career

Karting
From 2003 to 2009, Kaiser competed in the International Kart Federation, in the IKF Regional Race Series, 2-Cycle Sprint Grand Nationals, and the Stars of Karting. In 2008 he claimed his first national championship in the HPV-1 class. In 2009, he won the Infinion Raceway 3 hr Karting Enduro.

Skip Barber
Kaiser joined Skip Barber Racing School's 2009/10 Western Regional Championship, earning second place and Rookie of the Year. In 2011, he returned to the series, earning third place in the championship. That year, he also participated in the Skip Barber Karting Scholarship shootout, earning a partial season scholarship with the race series.

Formula Car Challenge
In 2012, Kaiser competed in the Formula Car Challenge for World Speed Motorsports, in the Pro Mazda and FormulaSPEED classes. He earned the Pro Mazda championship title by winning 8 races, and finishing on the podium in 11 out of the 14 races.

Pro Mazda
He made his professional open wheel racing debut in September 2012 in the Star Mazda Championship at Mazda Raceway Laguna Seca. For the 2013 season, Kaiser joined World Speed Motorsports to race full-time in the Pro Mazda Championship. He finished seventh in the championship with a best finish of fifth (three times). He returns to the series for 2014, but switched teams to past series champions Juncos Racing. He finished on the podium in the first race of the 2014 Pro Mazda Winterfest. He finished the 2014 season 6th in points, recording four podium finishes and earning his first professional victory at Sonoma Raceway in the season finale.

Indy Lights
For 2015, Kaiser moved up to Indy Lights with juncos racing . He scored two podiums and seven top 5s out of 16 races, finishing sixth in the season standings. In 2016, he claimed two wins and eight podiums in 18 races, which put him third in the final classification. He signed with Juncos Racing for a third Indy Lights season in 2017 and won the Championship to claim the $1 million scholarship to race in IndyCar.

IndyCar
Kaiser announced he would move up to the Verizon IndyCar series with Juncos Racing for four races in 2018.

Kaiser competed in select IndyCar Series events with Juncos between 2018 and 2019. He is best known for knocking two time Formula One world champion Fernando Alonso out of the 2019 Indianapolis 500 by qualifying in the last possible spot on the grid, ending Alonso's joint McLaren/Carlin effort. Kaiser would not compete in either the 2020 IndyCar Series or 2021 IndyCar Series, as Juncos was trying to recoup financial losses brought on by the COVID-19 pandemic and would not be able to run their traditional Indianapolis 500 specific program which Kaiser had run in the past.

When Juncos Racing was rebranded as Juncos Hollinger Racing, Kaiser was one of the drivers that Ricardo Juncos and, new team co-owner, Brad Hollinger would consider for their first full-time IndyCar entry, which was due to be entered in the final three rounds of 2021 and from 2022 onward. The team ultimately chose Scuderia Ferrari test driver Callum Ilott for the full-time entry. Juncos however did not rule out bringing Kaiser on for a second car on a part time basis, including for the Indianapolis 500.

Motorsports career results

SCCA National Championship Runoffs

Pro Mazda Championship

Indy Lights

IndyCar Series
(key)

* Season still in progress.

Indianapolis 500

Complete WeatherTech SportsCar Championship results
(key) (Races in bold indicate pole position; races in italics indicate fastest lap)

References

External links

1996 births
Living people
Sportspeople from Santa Clara, California
Indy Pro 2000 Championship drivers
Indy Lights champions
Indy Lights drivers
IndyCar Series drivers
Indianapolis 500 drivers
24 Hours of Daytona drivers
International Kart Federation drivers
Juncos Hollinger Racing drivers
SCCA National Championship Runoffs participants